Open Fire is the debut studio album by American guitarist Ronnie Montrose. 

The album, which has jazz, rock and acoustic concepts that of similar to, Blow by Blow (1975) by Jeff Beck. Ronnie hints in previous Montrose albums that he was heading in this direction. Songs like "Whaler" and "One And a Half" from Warner Brothers Presents... Montrose! and "Tuft-Sedge" and "Merry-Go-Round" from Jump On It contained various acoustic, synthesizer and string elements that showed Ronnie was looking to branch out from his hard rock persona.

Ronnie reunited with friend Edgar Winter who produced the album and played piano and keyboards as well. Ronnie welcomed Montrose alumni Jim Alcivar on keyboards and Alan Fitzgerald on bass and were joined by drummer Rick Shlosser who appeared with Ronnie on Van Morrison's Tupelo Honey.

Content
The album begins with "Openers," an orchestral piece very similar in style to The Planets by Gustav Holst, which blends into "Open Fire," the closest thing to a straight-ahead rocker on this disc with an unmistakable Ronnie Montrose lead guitar sound. "Mandolinia" begins with a Moog sequencer bass followed by layers of mandolin sounds and guitars. "Town Without Pity" is a cover that replaces Gene Pitney's vocals with lead guitar work by Ronnie and backed by piano from Edgar Winter; Bob Alcivar handles the orchestral arrangements. "Leo Rising" is an acoustic guitar piece. "Heads Up" and "Rocky Road" are two examples of jazz fusion. "My Little Mystery" features more acoustic guitar with Edgar Winter manning the harpsichord and further use of Bob Alcivar's orchestra, resulting in a Baroque ending. The album ends with a song titled "No Beginning/No End." A Moog-based synth intro by Jim Alcivar starts the song; Ronnie then enters with acoustic playing before closing the song with trademark electric soloing.

On the strength of this effort, Montrose was invited to perform with accomplished jazz and jazz fusion drummer Tony Williams. On July 27, 1978, Montrose joined Williams, Brian Auger (keyboards), Mario Cipollina (bass) and special guest Billy Cobham also on drums for a show in Tokyo as the "Tony Williams All Stars". The setlist included "Rocky Road", "Heads Up" and "Open Fire" and the "Open Fire" performance appears on The Joy of Flying by Tony Williams (1978).

Track listing
Side One
 "Openers" - (Bob Alcivar) - 2:54
 "Open Fire" - (Ronnie Montrose, Edgar Winter) - 3:53
 Ronnie Montrose - guitar, theremin
 Jim Alcivar - Moog synthesizer, sequencer programming
 Alan Fitzgerald - bass
 Rick Schlosser - drums
 "Mandolinia" - (Montrose) - 3:14
 Ronnie Montrose - guitar, mandolin, mandocello
 Jim Alcivar - sequencer programming
 Edgar Winter - bass synthesizer
 Rick Schlosser - drums
 "Town Without Pity" - (Dimitri Tiomkin, Ned Washington) - 3:17
 Ronnie Montrose - guitar
 Edgar Winter - piano
 Alan Fitzgerald - bass
 Rick Schlosser - drums
 "Leo Rising" - (Montrose) - 3:49
 Ronnie Montrose - guitar
 Jim Alcivar - ondes Martenot
Side Two 
 "Heads Up" - (Montrose, Winter) - 3:39
 Ronnie Montrose - guitar
 Alan Fitzgerald - bass
 Rick Schlosser - drums
 "Rocky Road" - (J. Thomassie, C. Brent, J. Smith) - 4:23
 Ronnie Montrose - guitar
 Edgar Winter - piano
 Alan Fitzgerald - bass
 Rick Schlosser - drums
 "My Little Mystery" - (Montrose) - 4:40
 Ronnie Montrose - guitar
 Edgar Winter - harpsichord
 "No Beginning/No End" - (Montrose)- 5:54
 Ronnie Montrose - guitar
 Jim Alcivar - Moog synthesizer, effects
 Edgar Winter - piano
 Alan Fitzgerald - bass
 Rick Schlosser - drums

Personnel
Ronnie Montrose – guitar, theremin, mandolin, mandocello
Edgar Winter - piano, harpsichord, Moog sequencer bass
Jim Alcivar - Moog synthesizer, martenot, sequencer programming
Alan Fitzgerald – bass
Rick Shlosser – drums
Bob Alcivar - orchestra arrangement, conductor

Production 
Edgar Winter - producer
Dick Bogert - engineer

References
Ronnie Montrose; "Open Fire" liner notes; Warner Bros. Records 1978
[ All Music Guide]

1978 albums
Ronnie Montrose albums
Warner Records albums